Premià de Mar is a municipality in the comarca of the Maresme in Catalonia, Spain. It is situated on the coast between El Masnou and Vilassar de Mar, to the north-east of Barcelona. The town is both a tourist centre and a dormitory town for Barcelona.

Like almost all municipalities of Maresme, Premià de Mar has been historically very well connected with the rest of the comarca and with Barcelona thanks to old Camí Ral (Royal Way) (actual N-II main road) and railroad (Barcelona-Mataró railroad route (1848) was the first to be constructed in all the Iberian Peninsula). Communications have been enhanced in recent years with the construction (1969) of the C-32's Barcelona-Mataró section, also the first autopista (highway) to be constructed in all the Iberian Peninsula.

The town centre has buildings in a wide range of styles: neoclassical, modernista, noucentista 
and simply eclectic. The church of Sant Cristòfol has a baroque doorway with maritime motifs.

Demography

Education

Primary schools

Public schools 

 Escola Sant Cristòfol
 Escola El Dofí
 Escola La Lió
 Escola Mar Nova 
 Escola Montserrat

Private schools 

 Escola Assís
 Escola Verge del Pilar
 Escola La Salle

High schools 
Institut Premia de Mar (public)

References

 Panareda Clopés, Josep Maria; Rios Calvet, Jaume; Rabella Vives, Josep Maria (1989). Guia de Catalunya, Barcelona: Caixa de Catalunya.  (Spanish).  (Catalan).

External links 

Official website 
 Government data pages 
Historic-artistic heritage

Municipalities in Maresme